The General Aircraft GAL.47 was a 1940s British single-engined twin-boom Air Observation Post aircraft, built by General Aircraft Limited at London Air Park, Hanworth.

Design and development
The GAL.47 was a private-venture design of an air observation post (AOP) aircraft. The Fane F.1/40 was the only other competing design. The GAL.47 was a twin-boom configuration with a pusher airscrew. One example was built (test registration T-0224) in 1940 at London Air Park, Hanworth. It was destroyed on 2 April 1942.

Specifications

See also

Notes

References

External links
 Photo at 1000aircraftphotos.com

1940s British military utility aircraft
Single-engined pusher aircraft
47
Twin-boom aircraft
High-wing aircraft
Aircraft first flown in 1940